WJNK-LD, virtual and UHF digital channel 34, is a low-powered television station licensed to Nashville, Tennessee, United States. The station is owned by Edge Spectrum Inc.

History

Early years
The station signed on the air on June 25, 1986, under the ownership of Tiger Eye Broadcasting as W61AR, broadcasting on analog UHF channel 61. The station moved to analog channel 54 for a few months under the callsign W52AR from January until April 1989, when it returned to channel 61 and reverted to the station's original callsign. The station became WJNK-LP when it relocated to analog channel 34 in 1997, and had broadcasting on that channel ever since. From the station's sign on in 1986 until 1999, the station was an independent station and also carried FamilyNet as a secondary affiliation.

As a 3ABN O&O station
On January 20, 1999, Tiger Eye Broadcasting sold WJNK-LP to 3ABN. The sale of the station was finalized on April 13, 1999, and at the same time, the station switched to broadcasting Religious Programming from 3ABN 24 hours a day, as the station would broadcast in that format & broadcast programming from 3ABN until December 10, 2021.

Sale to Edge Spectrum
On March 9, 2017, Three Angels Broadcasting Network filed to sell WJNK-LD to Edge Spectrum Inc. The sale & transfer was finalized on August 31, 2017. 3ABN would continue to operate the Station, Until October 1, 2018, when Edge Spectrum fully took over operations of WJNK. Also under new ownership & on October 1, 2018, 3ABN Proclaim was discontinued from 34.2, to make way for a new religious network "Quo Vadis", which debuted on November 1, 2018, In addition, 3ABN Latino was also discontinued from 34.4, and it would be replaced a month later with Daystar on November 15, 2018. However, on January 1, 2019, both Quo Vadis & Daystar would be discontinued from Channels 34.2 & 34.4 at the same time without warning.

Conversion to ATSC 3.0
Edge Spectrum (Owner of WJNK-LD) recently announced that all of their stations (Including WJNK-LD) will convert to ATSC 3.0 on or after January 15, 2022. ESI owns and operates low-power television stations and sees itself as well-positioned for the new ATSC 3.0 broadcasting standards. Also in preparation for this move, the station was taken silent in the process and also discontinued all programming and subchannels from 3ABN on December 10, 2021. It was then announced on the following day that ARK Multicasting had entered in to an agreement with Edge Spectrum to operate the station via LMA. ARK Multicasting will also operate nine other low-powered stations owned by Edge Spectrum in nine other markets. This will see that the television stations will be used for other purposes (besides broadcasting) which will see them also being used, such as for internet services or to provide cable television from cable networks. (As this is already happening in the Boise, Idaho and Phoenix, Arizona Markets.) No plans have not been announced as of yet, and will not be announced and made to the public until or after January 15, 2022. It was then reveled the next day, that WJNK's 3.0 Spectrum would be used for a new broadcasting internet service that will launch next year in 2022. WJNK-LD returned to the air on Monday, December 20, 2021, carrying a repeating looping message that "The station will become affiliated with IBN Television on or after January 15, 2022, and also stating that an ATSC 3.0 Compatibility Receiver will be needed to receive the station and its programming." It also list the other stations that Edge Spectrum owns & that will also be converting to ATSC 3.0. On July 28, 2022, WJNK-LD officially returned to the air as a ATSC 3.0 station. The station was to become an affiliate of the IBN Television Network, but instead affiliated with Trinity Broadcasting Network, and adding two of its sister networks, TBN Inspire and Smile to its second and third subchannels. A new television set with an ATSC 3.0 tuner is now required to view the station, but these Three Networks are also shown on TBN Owned-and-operated Station WPGD-TV.

Digital television

Digital channels
The station's digital signal is multiplexed:

Former affiliations

Analog-to-digital conversion
WJNK's digital signal began broadcasting on digital UHF channel 28 in 2012. The station's digital counterpart was operated on a construction permit in preparation of the Digital television transition for low-powered television stations that have not shut down their analog signals. However, on January 27, 2017, WJNK applied for a construction permit to relocate their digital channel from channel 28 to channel 34, where they broadcast their analog signal from 1997 to June 22, 2017, as WJNK flash-cut its analog signal to a digital signal on channel 34 on that day, while also ceasing its analog signal.

References

External links

Three Angels Broadcasting Network
JNK-LD
Television channels and stations established in 1986
1986 establishments in Tennessee
Low-power television stations in the United States
ATSC 3.0 television stations